Jackie Dixon may refer to:

Jacqui Farnham (née Dixon), a character in the TV show Brookside
Jackie Dixon (singer) who performed in "Pussyfoot" at the 1980 Song for Europe